Transfield may refer to:

Broadspectrum, formerly Transfield Services, Australian company established in 2001
Transfield Holdings, Australian company established in 1956